The Villa Müller is a Modernist villa in Prague, Czech Republic built in 1930. It was designed by Adolf Loos as a residence for František Müller, co-owner of the Kapsa-Müller construction company from Pilsen.

History 

The building was commissioned by František Müller and his wife, Milada Müllerová. Mr. Müller was an engineer and co-owned a construction company called Kapsa and Müller. The company specialized in reinforced concrete, developing new construction techniques. Loos' method of design was also in transition, making the timing of the project appropriate. Soon, the architect Karel Lhota set František Müller up with Loos to design the villa. Lhota also contributed to the design due to Loos' poor health. After the building was completed, Loos celebrated his 60th birthday there with a few friends.

The couple freely inhabited the house for eighteen years before Communists seized control of it in 1948. In 1968, after the death of Milada Müllerová the most important parts of the Villa fittings and collections were purchased by the Museum of Applied Arts and the National Gallery.  The Villa was then pronounced a Cultural Monument of the Czechoslovak Republic. It was used as a storage,  library, and later as a location for the institute of Marxism–Leninism. After the fall of Communism in 1989, the house was turned over to the Müllers' daughter, Eva Maternová. She sold it to the City of Prague in 1995, who put it in the care of the City of Prague Museum. The house was restored in 1998 and finally re-opened as a museum in 2000.

Architecture 

Known as an innovative landmark of early modernist architecture, the Villa Müller embodies Loos' ideas of economy and functionality. The spatial design, known as Raumplan, is evident in the multi-level parts of individual rooms, indicating their function and symbolic importance. Raumplan is exhibited in the interior as well as the exterior.

The exterior displayed Loos' theory discussed in his 1908 essay, "Ornament and Crime". In the essay, Loos criticized decorated surfaces. For the exterior of the Villa Müller, Loos designed a white, cubic facade. He also wanted to distinguish between the outside, where the view could be seen by the public eye, and the inside, the private spaces of those who lived there. Consequently, the interior is lavishly decorated with comfortable furniture and marble, wood, and silk surfaces.

Colomina: space and sexuality
Architectural historian Beatriz Colomina examined and discussed the Villa Müller in the book Sexuality and Space (1992), which focused on the relationships between sexuality and space within the structure. Colomina's essay, The Split Wall: Domestic Voyeurism, discusses the possible purpose of Loos' opaque, covered windows in the house. Colomina includes Loos' idea of a theater box as a claustrophobic space if not for the large, open space to look out on. The theater box could signify power and control inside of the house, according to Colomina.

Loos designed a raised sitting area which Colomina interprets as the theater box as well as the 'female' space because of its domestic character. Moreover, Colomina suggests that the 'female' space is considered private and contrasts with the 'male' public spaces of the house. The theater box draws attention to itself, and at the same time the occupant of the box is looking out, the person looking at it views the most intimate space. Therefore, the person in the theater box is objectified.

Footnotes

Notes

References

External links 
 

2000 establishments in the Czech Republic
Adolf Loos buildings
Buildings and structures in Prague
Historic house museums in the Czech Republic
Houses completed in 1930
Modernist architecture in the Czech Republic
Museums in Prague
National Cultural Monuments of the Czech Republic
1930 establishments in Czechoslovakia
21st-century architecture in the Czech Republic